The 1940 All-Ireland Senior Camogie Championship was the high point of the 1940 season in Camogie. The championship was won by Cork, who defeated Galway by a five-point margin in the final.

Structure
Dublin were still in isolation, the only remaining members left of the old Camogie association while the other country boards affiliated to the National Camogie Association after a dispute over lifting the ban on hockey players. Cork defeated Waterford by 5–3 to 1–4 in the only match played in Munster, a match refereed by dual All-Ireland medallist and future Taoiseach, Jack Lynch. Antrim, champions for five years in Ulster, were surprisingly beaten by Derry, who then lost the Ulster final to Cavan. Celia Mulholland, Eileen O'Beirne, Peg Morris and Frances Coen scored Galway's goals in their semi-final defeat of Cavan. Louth had most of the play and did most of the attacking in the second half when they lost to Cork in the semi-final at Darver. Renee Fitzgerald, Eileen Casey, Kathleen Barry Murphy and Casey again were Cork's goalscorers.

Final
Cork led Galway by 4–1 to 0–1 by half-time in the final and won despite being kept Cork scoreless for the remainder of the game and Galway's recovery goals from Peg Morris and Celia Mulholland.

Final stages

 
 Match Rules
50 minutes
Replay if scores level
Maximum of 3 substitutions

See also
 All-Ireland Senior Hurling Championship
 Wikipedia List of Camogie players
 National Camogie League
 Camogie All Stars Awards
 Ashbourne Cup

References

External links
 Camogie Association
 All-Ireland Senior Camogie Championship: Roll of Honour
 Historical reports of All Ireland finals
 Camogie on facebook
 Camogie on GAA Oral History Project

1940 in camogie
1940